NGC 1275 (also known as Perseus A or Caldwell 24) is a type 1.5 Seyfert galaxy located around 237 million light-years away in the direction of the constellation Perseus. NGC 1275 corresponds to the radio galaxy Perseus A and is situated near the center of the large Perseus Cluster of galaxies.

Properties

NGC 1275 consists of two galaxies, a central type-cD galaxy in the Perseus Cluster, and a so-called "high velocity system" (HVS) which lies in front of it. The HVS is moving at 3000 km/s towards the dominant system, and is believed to be merging with the Perseus Cluster. The HVS is not affecting the cD galaxy as it lies at least 200 thousand light years from it. However tidal interactions are disrupting it and ram-pressure stripping produced by its interaction with the intracluster medium of Perseus is stripping its gas as well as producing large amounts of star formation within it

The central cluster galaxy contains a massive network of spectral line emitting filaments, which apparently are being dragged out by rising bubbles of relativistic plasma generated by the central active galactic nucleus. Long gaseous filaments made up of threads of gas stretch out beyond the galaxy, into the multimillion-degree, X-ray–emitting gas that fills the cluster. The amount of gas contained in a typical thread is approximately one million times the mass of the Sun. They are only 200 light-years wide, are often very straight, and extend for up to 20,000 light-years.

The existence of the filaments poses a problem. As they are much cooler than the surrounding intergalactic cloud, it is unclear how they have existed for such a long time, or why they have not warmed, dissipated or collapsed to form stars. One possibility is that weak magnetic fields (about one-ten-thousandth the strength of Earth's field) exert enough force on the ions within the threads to keep them together.

NGC 1275 contains 13 billion solar masses of molecular hydrogen that seems to be infalling from Perseus' intracluster medium in a cooling flow, both feeding its active nucleus and fueling significant amounts of star formation

The presence of an active nucleus demonstrates that a supermassive black hole is present in NGC 1275's center. The black hole is surrounded by a rotating disk of molecular gas.  High-resolution observations of the rotation of this disk obtained using adaptive optics at the Gemini North telescope indicate a central mass of approximately 800 million Solar masses, including both the mass of the black hole and of the inner core of the gas disk.

References

External links

 
 APOD (2003-05-05) – NASA image & description
 APOD (2005-07-25) – NASA image showing unusual gas filaments
 Fabian, A.C., et al. "A deep Chandra observation of the Perseus cluster: shocks and ripples". Monthly Notices of the Royal Astronomical Society. Vol. 344 (2003): L43 (arXiv:astro-ph/0306036v2).
 Fabian, A.C. Nature 454, 968–970.
 Gabany, R. Jay. cosmotography.com – An image made with a 20" telescope, which displays the unusual gas filaments

Peculiar galaxies
Interacting galaxies
Seyfert galaxies
Starburst galaxies
Radio galaxies
Luminous infrared galaxies
Perseus (constellation)
1275
02669
012429
84
Perseus Cluster
024b